The 1997 British National Track Championships were a series of track cycling competitions held from 18–26 July 1997 at the Manchester Velodrome. The Championships were organised by the British Cycling Federation.

Medal summary

Men's Events

Women's Events

References

National Track Championships